The demagnetizing field, also called the stray field (outside the magnet), is the magnetic field (H-field) generated by the magnetization in a magnet. The total magnetic field in a region containing magnets is the sum of the demagnetizing fields of the magnets and the magnetic field due to any free currents or displacement currents. The term demagnetizing field reflects its tendency to act on the magnetization so as to reduce the total magnetic moment. It gives rise to shape anisotropy in ferromagnets with a single magnetic domain and to magnetic domains in larger ferromagnets.

The demagnetizing field of an arbitrarily shaped object requires a numerical solution of Poisson's equation even for the simple case of uniform magnetization. For the special case of ellipsoids (including infinite cylinders) the demagnetization field is linearly related to the magnetization by a geometry dependent constant called the demagnetizing factor. Since the magnetization of a sample at a given location depends on the total magnetic field at that point, the demagnetization factor must be used in order to accurately determine how a magnetic material responds to a magnetic field.  (See magnetic hysteresis.)

Magnetostatic principles

Maxwell's equations

In general the demagnetizing field is a function of position . It is derived from the magnetostatic equations for a body with no electric currents. These are Ampère's law

and Gauss's law

The magnetic field and flux density are related by

The magnetic potential

The general solution of the first equation can be expressed as the gradient of a scalar potential :

Outside the body, where the magnetization is zero,

At the surface of the magnet, there are two continuity requirements:
The component of  parallel to the surface must be continuous (no jump in value at the surface).
The component of  perpendicular to the surface must be continuous.
This leads to the following boundary conditions at the surface of the magnet:

The outer potential  must also be regular at infinity: both  and  must be bounded as  goes to infinity. This ensures that the magnetic energy is finite. Sufficiently far away, the magnetic field looks like the field of a magnetic dipole with the same moment as the finite body.

Uniqueness of the demagnetizing field

The demagnetizing field   is the gradient of this potential (equation ).

Energy
The energy of the demagnetizing field is completely determined by an integral over the volume  of the magnet:

The energy of the first magnet in the demagnetizing field   of the second is

The reciprocity theorem states that

Magnetic charge and the pole-avoidance principle
Formally, the solution of the equations for the potential is

Qualitatively, the negative of the divergence of the magnetization  (called a volume pole) is analogous to a bulk bound electric charge in the body while  (called a surface pole) is analogous to a bound surface electric charge. Although the magnetic charges do not exist, it can be useful to think of them in this way. In particular, the arrangement of magnetization that reduces the magnetic energy can often be understood in terms of the pole-avoidance principle, which states that the magnetization tries to reduce the poles as much as possible.

Effect on magnetization

Single domain

One way to remove the magnetic poles inside a ferromagnet is to make the magnetization uniform. This occurs in single-domain ferromagnets. This still leaves the surface poles, so division into domains reduces the poles further. However, very small ferromagnets are kept uniformly magnetized by the exchange interaction.

The concentration of poles depends on the direction of magnetization (see the figure). If the magnetization is along the longest axis, the poles are spread across a smaller surface, so the energy is lower. This is a form of magnetic anisotropy called shape anisotropy.

Multiple domains

If the ferromagnet is large enough, its magnetization can divide into domains. It is then possible to have the magnetization parallel to the surface. Within each domain the magnetization is uniform, so there are no volume poles, but there are surface poles at the interfaces (domain walls) between domains. However, these poles vanish if the magnetic moments on each side of the domain wall meet the wall at the same angle (so that the components  are the same but opposite in sign). Domains configured this way are called closure domains.

Demagnetizing factor

An arbitrarily shaped magnetic object has a total magnetic field that varies with location inside the object and can be quite difficult to calculate.  This makes it very difficult to determine the magnetic properties of a material such as, for instance, how the magnetization of a material varies with the magnetic field.  For a uniformly magnetized sphere in a uniform magnetic field  the internal magnetic field  is uniform:

This equation can be generalized to include ellipsoids having principal axes in x, y, and z directions such that each component has a relationship of the form:

Other important examples are an infinite plate (an ellipsoid with two of its axes going to infinity) which has  in a direction normal to the plate and zero otherwise and an infinite cylinder (an ellipsoid with one of its axes tending toward infinity with the other two being the same) which has  along its axis and  perpendicular to its axis. The demagnetizing factors are the principal values of the depolarization tensor, which gives both the internal and external values of the fields induced in ellipsoidal bodies by applied electric or magnetic fields.

Notes and references

Further reading

Electric and magnetic fields in matter
Magnetostatics
Potentials